Anamir A'la is a sub-district located in Jiblah District, Ibb Governorate, Yemen. Anamir A'la had a population of 6,519 according to the 2004 census.

References 

Sub-districts in Jiblah District